Qarah Saqal or Qareh Saqqal or Qareh Saqal may refer to:
 Qarah Saqal, East Azerbaijan
 Qareh Saqqal, Kurdistan
 Qareh Saqqal, West Azerbaijan